Abia State House of Assembly is the legislative arm of the Abia State Government. It is a unicameral body consisting of 24 members elected into 24 state constituencies and presided by a Speaker.

Composition

Leadership

Members

Committees

References

 
Politics of Abia State
State lower houses in Nigeria